At the 1990 Goodwill Games, the Ice hockey events were held in Kennewick and Tacoma, Washington, United States between July and August 1990.

Prior to the first game played by the Soviet Union national ice hockey team, star player Sergei Fedorov defected and signed a five-year contract with the Detroit Red Wings. Soviet administrator Yuri Korolev insisted that his player was stolen by premeditated actions and, rather than defecting on his own "under normal circumstances". He said that "having this happen on the eve of the goodwill games, is like a spoon of tar in a barrel of honey".

Preliminary round

Group A

Group B

Consolation Round

7th Place Match

5th Place Match

Playoff round

Semifinals

Bronze medal game

Gold medal game

Final ranking

See also 
 1990 Men's World Ice Hockey Championships

References

 http://www.passionhockey.com/hockeyarchives/inter1991.htm

1990 Goodwill Games
1990
Goodwill Games